West Champaran is an administrative district in the state of Bihar in India, located just  west of Birgunj. It is the largest district in Bihar with an area of 5,228 km²(2,019sq mi). It is a part of Tirhut Division. The district headquarters are located in Bettiah. The district is known for its open border with Nepal.
One of the major location in West Champaran is Kumar Bagh for SAIL Special Processing Unit and Bhitiharwa where Mahatma Gandhi started Satyagrah Aandolan.

Geography

Flora and fauna
It is also home to two wildlife sanctuaries: Valmiki (adjacent to its namesake national park) and
Udaypur Wildlife Sanctuary. Fauna include the Bengal tiger.

Sub-Divisions
West Champaran district comprises the following Sub-Divisions: Bettiah, Bagaha, and Narkatiaganj.

Blocks: Bettiah, Sikta, Mainatand, Chanpattia, Bairia, Lauria, Bagaha - 1, Bagaha - 2, Madhubani, Gaunaha, Narkatiaganj, Manjhaulia, Nautan, Jogapatti, Ramnagar, Thakraha, Bhitaha, Piprasi

The district is well connected by roads and railways to all major cities.

Politics
Lok Sabha constituencies in the district are Paschim Champaran, Valmiki Nagar.

Vidhan Sabha constituencies in the district are Valmiki Nagar, Ramnagar, Narkatiaganj, Bagaha, Lauriya, Nautan, Chanpatia,    Bettiah, Sikta

  

|}

Demographics

According to the 2011 census West Champaran district has a population of 3,935,042, roughly equal to the nation of Liberia or the US state of Oregon. This gives it a ranking of 63rd in India (out of a total of 640). Its population growth rate over the decade 2001-2011 was 28.89%. Pashchim Champaran has a sex ratio of 906 females for every 1000 males, and a literacy rate of 58.06%. 9.99% of the population lives in urban areas. Scheduled Castes and Tribes made up 14.08% and 6.35% of the population respectively.

Languages 

At the time of the 2011 Census of India, 91.86% of the population in the district spoke Bhojpuri, 3.32% Hindi and 2.97% Urdu as their first language.

Languages include Bhojpuri, a tongue in the Bihari language group with almost 51,000,000 speakers, written in both the Devanagari and Kaithi scripts.

Culture
The city is the birthplace of poet Gopal Singh Nepali. Mahatma Gandhi started the Champaran Satyagraha movement from here in 1917 along with nationalists Rajendra Prasad, Anugrah Narayan Sinha and Brajkishore Prasad.

Notable people
 
 
 Manoj Bajpayee, film actor.
 Vinay Bihari, actor, lyricist.
 Mahatma Gandhi, freedom fighter who started the Champaran Satyagraha movement here.
 Sanjay Jaiswal, politician
 Prakash Jha, film director.
 Manish Jha, film director and theatre actor.
 Sanjeev K Jha, script writer, filmmaker
 Sunil Kumar Kushwaha , Member of Parliament
 Baidyanath Prasad Mahto, politician, Member of Parliament.
 Krishna Kumar Mishra, politician.
 Vikas Mishra (economist)
 Gopal Singh Nepali, Hindi poet.
 Gauri Shankar Pandey, politician.
 Kedar Pandey, former Chief Minister of Bihar
 Raghaw Sharan Pandey, IAS (Retd), former Union Petroleum Secretary, politician 
 Damodar Raao, film music director, actor & singer
 Valmiki Rishi, an ascetic who wrote Hindu epic Ramayana here.

See also 

East Champaran district

References

External links

 West Champaran Official website

 
Tirhut division
Districts of Bihar
Minority Concentrated Districts in India
1972 establishments in Bihar